Abirameswarar Temple (also called Thiruvamathur Temple) is a Hindu temple dedicated to the deity Shiva, located in thiruvamaathur, a village in Viluppuram district in the South Indian state of Tamil Nadu. Shiva is worshiped as Abirameswarar, and is represented by the lingam. His consort Parvati is depicted as Manonmani Amman. The temple is located on the Chennai - Villupuram highway. The presiding deity is revered in the 7th century Tamil Saiva canonical work, the Tevaram, written by Tamil saint poets known as the nayanmars and classified as Paadal Petra Sthalam.

The temple complex covers an area of two acres and all its shrines are enclosed with concentric rectangular walls. The temple has a number of shrines, with those of Abirameswarar being the most prominent. There is a temple opposite to the premises that houses the shrine of Muthamman, the consort of Abirameswarar.

The temple has three daily rituals at various times from 6:00 a.m. to 8:30 p.m., and many yearly festivals on its calendar. Sivaratri festival during the Tamil month of Masi (February–March) and Navaratri during the month of Purattasi (September - October) are the most prominent festivals celebrated in the temple.

The original complex is believed to have been built by Cholas.And Main temple was built by Achyuta Deva Raya of Vijayanagara Empire.  In modern times, the temple is maintained and administered by the Hindu Religious and Charitable Endowments Department of the Government of Tamil Nadu.

Legend and history

As per Hindu legend, during the original creation, cows were without horns and all the other predators were troubling them. They prayed to Shiva to provide them horns. Shiva was pleased with the devotion and offered them horns. Since cows (called aa in Tamil) got horns at this place, it came to be known as Thiruamathur. The presiding image of lingam is sported holding the hooves of cow. As per another legend, the image of Ambal is sported with the tail of snake. There is a small hole in the wall between the shrines of Shiva and Parvathi located in opposite shrines through which the deities see each other.

The original structure is believed to be existent from time immemorial, while the later additions are believed to have been built by Cholas, Pallavas, and the main temple was built by Atchudevaraya of Vijayanagar Dynasty. There are inscriptions from later Chola emperors like Rajaraja Chola I (985–1014), Kulothunga Chola I (1070–1120), and Rajendra Chola III (1246–1279). Rajanarayana Sambuvaraya was a chieftain of Medieval Cholas whose contributions are documented in lithic inscriptions across various temples in modern-day Villupuram, Cuddalore, Tiruvannamalai and Kanchipuram districts and also in his Sanskrit work Madhuravijayam. He repaired, revived the services and inaugurated festivals of the temple.

Architecture
Abirameswarar temple is located in a village called Thiruvamathur on Viluppuram - Chennai highway. The temple has a seven-tiered entrance tower facing east, and all the shrines of the temple are enclosed in concentric rectangular granite walls. The shrine of Muthambigai is housed in a shrine facing west is located opposite to the central shrine outside the rajagopuram. The shrine of Muthambigai also has a three tiered entrance tower. The central shrine housing Abirameswarar is approached through pillared halls. The shrine houses the image of Abirameswarar in the form of Lingam (an iconic form of Shiva). The central shrine is approached through a Mahamandapam and Arthamandapam. As in other Shiva temples in Tamil Nadu, the shrines of Vinayaka, Murugan, Navagraha, Chandekeswara and Durga are located around the precinct of the main shrine.

Religious importance and festivals

It is one of the shrines of the 275 Paadal Petra Sthalams - Shiva Sthalams glorified in the early medieval Tevaram poems by Tamil Saivite Nayanars Appar. Appar is believed to have visited the temple during the series of visits from Thiruvennainallur to Thirukovilur and Pennadam. Rama, an avatar and hero of Ramayana is believed to have purified himself of the sin of killing Ravana by worshipping Shiva at this place. The image of Shiva is believed to have been self manifested. The image of Muthamai is believed to have been installed by Adi Sankaracharya. It is also believed to be the place where Muruga attained the Vel, his weapon from Parvathi to kill the demon Surapadma. The presiding deity has been worshipped by various celestial deities. Arunagirinathar has sung praises about Muruga in the temple.

The temple priests perform the puja (rituals) during festivals and on a daily basis. The temple rituals are performed three times a day; Kalasanthi at 8:00 a.m., Uchikalam at 11:30 a.m. and Sayarakshai at 5:00 p.m. Each ritual comprises four steps: abhisheka (sacred bath), alangaram (decoration), naivethanam (food offering) and deepa aradanai (waving of lamps) for Abirameswarar and Muthambigai. Sivaratri festival during the Tamil month of Masi (February–March) and Navaratri during the month of Purattasi (September - October) are the most prominent festivals celebrated in the temple.

References

External links

Shiva temples in Viluppuram district
Padal Petra Stalam